Lester B. Pearson Collegiate Institute, also known as LBP, Lester B. Pearson CI, LBPCI,  or simply Pearson, is a public high school in Toronto, Ontario, Canada. Located in the Malvern neighbourhood, the school operates grades 9 through 12 under the sanction of the Toronto District School Board. Opened in 1978, it formerly was part of the Scarborough Board of Education.

Overview
The LBP is located at 150 Tapscott Road. It is located across from Malvern Town Centre and can be easily accessed by various TTC bus routes. LBP is a school with a multicultural group of students coming from 56 different countries, speaking 42 languages, and practicing 17 different religions. The school attempts to promote appreciation of diversity as inspired by its motto, "Peace through Understanding" taken from the 1957 Nobel Peace Prize speech by Lester B. Pearson. Students and parents place a high priority on education and employability skills. A comprehensive career exploration program assists students in making informed post-secondary decisions.

The Pearson School crest
The stylized human figures in the outside circle have outstretched arms, symbolizing understanding among the nations of the world. The circular shape represents the world, and contains the dove of peace and Canada's maple leaf.

Notable alumni
 Lilly Singh - YouTube personality and host of A Little Late with Lilly Singh (Class of 2006)

Features
 Advanced placement credits in grade 12 math, chemistry and biology
 Enriched classes in math and science from grades 9-11, and English in grades 9, 10 and 11
 The 'STEPS' program offers an additional university credit
 Specialized high skills major for health and wellness
 Two and four credit co-op; dual credits that also grant college credits 
 Nighana program: Afrocentric focus in grades 9 and 10
 Extensive co-curricular and athletic activities, with a wide range of teams, intramural tournaments, clubs, special events and leadership opportunities
 Numerous student success strategies

Specialist high skills major - health and wellness
Lester B. Pearson's newest program is the health and wellness specialist high skills major (SHSM). It is a new initiative from the Ministry of Education. This program would allow students to acquire technical knowledge and skills that will assist them in entering a future career of their choice. Pearson students will receive recognition on their high school diploma and a set of industry-recognized certification. This program is recognized by colleges, universities, and employers.

Special programs
The school has partnered with the University of Toronto and offer a full sociology credit taught by a university professor at Pearson. Successful students receive a university credit that can be used at any university, as well as two high school credits. The music program has also been reinstated. It also offers advanced placement courses in calculus, chemistry and biology. Pearson offers the Nighana program where there is an emphasis on Afro-Canadian history and literature.

Pre- and advanced placement (AP)
The AP program of Pearson is recognized by universities in both Canada and the United States. One can earn advanced standing at university in science through their AP Physics course. the AP calculus, chemistry and biology courses have been removed over the years due to low participation and lack of qualified instructors. Despite this, enriched (pre-AP) math, English and science credits are still available in grades 9, 10 and 11.

See also
List of high schools in Ontario

External links
 Lester B. Pearson Collegiate Institute
TDSB Profile
 Student Web portal

High schools in Toronto
Schools in the TDSB
Educational institutions established in 1978
1978 establishments in Ontario
Education in Scarborough, Toronto